Maria Ioannou (born 24 November 1991) is a Cypriot footballer who plays as a defender for Apollon Ladies F.C. and the Cyprus women's national team.

Career
Ioannou has been capped for the Cyprus national team, appearing for the team during the UEFA Women's Euro 2022 qualifying cycle.

References

External links
 
 
 

1991 births
Living people
Women's association football defenders
Cypriot women's footballers
Cyprus women's international footballers
Apollon Ladies F.C. players